Corpus Christi (Ecclesiastical Latin: "Body of Christ") is a coastal city in the South Texas region of the U.S. state of Texas and the county seat and largest city of Nueces County, it also extends into Aransas, Kleberg, and San Patricio Counties. Its political boundaries encompass Nueces Bay and Corpus Christi Bay. Its zoned boundaries include small land parcels or water inlets of three neighboring counties.

The city's population was 317,863 in 2020, making it the eighth-most populous city in Texas. The Corpus Christi metropolitan area had an estimated population of 442,600. It is also the hub of the six-county Corpus Christi-Kingsville Combined Statistical Area, with a 2013 estimated population of 516,793. The Port of Corpus Christi is the fifth-largest in the United States. The region is served by the Corpus Christi International Airport.

The city's name means body of Christ in Ecclesiastical Latin, in reference to the Christian sacrament of Holy Communion. The name was given to the settlement and surrounding bay by Spanish explorer Alonso Álvarez de Pineda in 1519, as he discovered the lush semitropical bay on the Western Christian feast day of Corpus Christi.

Corpus Christi is home to Naval Air Station Corpus Christi, one of two locations training primary student pilots and advanced multi-engine pilots of the US Navy, US Marine Corps, and US Coast Guard.

History

Spaniard Alonso Alvarez de Pineda traveled in 1519 to this bay on the day of the religious Feast of Corpus Christi, so named the semitropical bay Corpus Christi.

Cabeza de Vaca may have passed through Corpus Christi in the 1500s, but the first European to study the Nueces River and Corpus Christi Bay was Joaquín de Orobio y Basterr in 1747. A few years later, José de Escandón organized a colony of about 50 families to settle the head of the bay, though this was short-lived.

In 1839, the first known permanent settlement of Corpus Christi was established by Colonel Henry Lawrence Kinney and William P. Aubrey as Kinney's Trading Post, or Kinney's Ranch.
In July 1845, U.S. troops commanded by General Zachary Taylor set up camp there in preparation for war with Mexico, where they remained until March 1846. About a year later, the settlement was named Corpus Christi and was incorporated on September 9, 1852.

The Battle of Corpus Christi was fought between August 12 and August 18, 1862, during the American Civil War. United States Navy forces blockading Texas fought a small land and sea engagement with Confederate forces in and around Corpus Christi Bay and bombarded the city. Union forces defeated Confederate States Navy ships operating in the area, but were repulsed when they landed on the coast.

The Port of Corpus Christi was opened in 1926, and the Corpus Christi Naval Air Station was commissioned in 1941.

The 1919 Storm devastated the city, killing hundreds on September 14. Only three structures survived the storm on North Beach. To protect the city, the seawall was built. The city also suffered damage from Hurricane Celia in 1970 and Hurricane Allen in 1980, but little damage from Hurricane Ike in 2008. In 2017, the city was affected by Hurricane Harvey then by Hurricane Hanna in 2020. Rough surf from Hurricane Laura caused one death and one injury at a beach in the city in late August 2020, just a month after Hanna.

Civil rights
 In November 1873, seven Mexican shepherds were lynched by a mob near the city. The crime was never solved.
 In February 1929, the League of United Latin American Citizens (LULAC) was founded in Corpus Christi. This organization was created to battle racial discrimination against Hispanic people in the United States. Since its founding, LULAC has grown and now has a national headquarters in Washington, DC.
 In March 1949, the American GI Forum (AGIF) was founded in Corpus Christi. Currently, AGIF focuses on veteran's issues, education, and civil-rights issues. This organization was founded after concerns over the segregation of Mexican-American veterans from other veterans groups and the denial of medical services based on race by the United States Department of Veterans Affairs.
 Cisneros v. Corpus Christi Independent School District (1970) was the first case to extend the U.S. Supreme Court's Brown v. the Board of Education of Topeka, Kansas decision (1954) to Mexican Americans. It recognized them as a minority group that could be and was frequently discriminated against. Such segregation and discrimination was ruled unconstitutional. Judge Woodrow Seals found that the school board consciously fostered a system that perpetuated traditional segregation. This included a system that bused Anglo students to schools out of their neighborhoods, renovated old schools in black and Mexican-American neighborhoods rather than building new ones, assigned black and Hispanic teachers to segregated schools, and limited hiring of such teachers at other schools; the school board also lacked a majority-to-minority busing system.

Geography 

Corpus Christi is situated on fluvial deposits that are of Holocene—Pleistocene age. Although no solidified rock occurs naturally at the surface, the Deweyville Formation of sand, silt, clay, and gravel, is locally indurated with calcium carbonate (caliche) deposits.  In 2017, Hurricane Harvey's storm surge eroded down to shale bedrock at a depth around 40 ft in Packery Channel, an artificial pass cut between North Padre and Mustang Islands. This feature has become a gathering place for game fish, and can be identified from the surface by its whirlpool-like current. The large, shallow bay makes Corpus Christi an ideal feeding place for birds, and this is one reason why Corpus Christi is known as the "Bird Capital" of North America. Consequently, the San Diego Audubon Society has designated  Corpus Christi  as "America's birdiest place".

According to the United States Census Bureau, Corpus Christi has a total area of 460.2 square miles (1,192.0 km2), of which 154.6 mi2 (400.5 km2, 33.60%) are land and 305.6 mi2 (791.5 km2, 66.40%) are covered by water.

Annexation
Since its founding, the city has annexed nearby lands and waters for growth and development purposes. The original area encompassed several city blocks in present-day downtown Corpus Christi with the majority of city expansion occurring in the 20th century.

Neighborhoods

 Annaville
 Clarkwood
 Bayside
 Calallen
 Flour Bluff
 Gardendale
 Hillcrest
 North Beach
 South Side
 Mustang Island
 North Padre Island

Suburbs

 Portland
 Robstown
 Aransas Pass
 Port Aransas
 Sinton
 Odem
 Gregory
 Mathis
 Taft
 Ingleside
 Agua Dulce
 Bishop

Climate

The city has a humid subtropical climate (Köppen: Cfa), with hot, very humid summers and very short, mild winters. In November through February, the weather is the coolest. A noticeable warming trend occurs in March through April. The warmest part of the year is June through September, with August being the peak of summer. October in the city is very warm, but not as hot as the summer. The city itself much like the Gulf Coast of Texas experiences just two seasons, a monsoon summer from April to October and a dry winter from November to March. Winter and early spring are generally dry, and average monthly precipitation is highest in September, when the threat from hurricanes and other tropical weather systems is greatest. The snow melted the day after Christmas. The city experienced light snowfall a second time, on December 8, 2017, nearly 13 years later.

Eight months with not even a trace of rainfall have happened, of which the most recent was May 1998, and 21 with merely a trace. The longest spell without measurable rainfall in Corpus Christi has been 55 days from June 23 to August 17 (inclusive) of 1895, and from June 1 to July 25 of 1915, while easily the driest calendar year has been 1917, with a mere .

Hurricanes seldom hit the city, but those which have were destructive, such as the 1919 Florida Keys hurricane and Hurricane Harvey in 2017. The city also can see tornadoes, with an F2 tornado hitting the area on April 29, 1961.

Demographics

2020 Census data

As of the 2020 United States census, there were 317,863 people, 117,789 households, and 79,055 families residing in the city.

2010 Census data

At the 2010 Census,  305,215 people resided in Corpus Christi, a 10.0% increase since 2000.

In 2012, Corpus Christi was ranked as the second-least literate city in the U.S. in a study by Central Connecticut State University.

According to the 2010 Census, 80.9% of Corpus Christi's population was White; 4.3% was African American; 1.8% Asian; 0.1% Pacific Islander; 10.4% of some other race; and 2.5% of two or more races. About 62.23% of Corpus Christi's population was of Hispanic or Latino origin, of any race, and 33.3% of the population was non-Hispanic White, down from 56% in 1970.

2000 Census data
At the census of 2000, 277,454 people, 98,791 households, and 70,437 families resided in the city. The population density was 1,794.2 people per square mile (692.7/km2). The 107,831 housing units averaged 697.3 per square mile (269.2/km2). The  racial makeup of the city was 71.62% White, 4.67% African American, 0.64% Native American, 1.28% Asian, 0.08% Pacific Islander, 18.58% from other races, and 3.13% from two or more races. Hispanics of any race were 54.33% of the population.

Of the 98,791 households, 36.1% had children under the age of 18 living with them, 50.9% were married couples living together, 15.4% had a female householder with no husband present, and 28.7% were not families. About 23.2% of all households were made up of individuals, and 7.9% had someone living alone who was 65 years of age or older. The average household size was 2.75 and the average family size was 3.27.

In the city, the population was distributed as 28.1% under the age of 18, 10.6% from 18 to 24, 29.2% from 25 to 44, 21.0% from 45 to 64, and 11.1% who were 65 years of age or older. The median age was 33 years. For every 100 females, there were 95.6 males. For every 100 females age 18 and over, there were 92.2 males.

The median income for a family was $41,672. Males had a median income of $31,863 versus $22,616 for females. The per capita income for the city was $17,419. About 14.1% of families and 17.6% of the population were below the poverty line, including 22.9% of those under age 18 and 15.5% of those ages 65 or over.

Economy
The majority of the population is employed in the services, wholesale and retail trades, and government sectors. Corpus Christi has an unemployment rate of 4.5% as of July 2019.

The Port of Corpus Christi, which is the fifth-largest U.S. port and deepest inshore port on the Gulf of Mexico, handles mostly oil and agricultural products. Much of the local economy is driven by tourism and the oil and petrochemicals industry. In 2005, the port was ranked as the 47th-largest in the world by cargo tonnage.

Corpus Christi is home to Naval Air Station Corpus Christi, providing 6,200 civilian jobs to the local economy, making it the single largest employer in the city. Corpus Christi Army Depot, located on NAS Corpus Christi, is the largest helicopter repair facility in the world. Additionally located on NAS Corpus Christi is the United States Coast Guard Sector/Air Station Corpus Christi.

Corpus Christi is the original home of the headquarters of Whataburger, a fast-food restaurant operator and franchiser with 650 stores in 10 states and Mexico; the company relocated its headquarters to San Antonio in 2009. Other large employers include CHRISTUS Spohn Health System at 5,400 local employees, the Corpus Christi Independent School District with 5,178, H-E-B at 5,000, and Bay Ltd. at 2,100. Other companies based in Corpus Christi include Stripes Convenience Stores and AEP Texas.

Corpus Christi became the first major city to offer citywide free wi-fi in April 2005  to allow remote meter reading after a meter reader was attacked by a dog. In 2007, the network was purchased by Earthlink for $5.5 million, and stopped being a free service on May 31, 2007.

Culture
Various sections of Corpus Christi maintain distinct senses of identity and community from the city proper, especially the Calallen and Flour Bluff areas.

Attractions
The city is home to a number of popular destinations for both tourists and residents. The official visitor and tourism information organization is the Corpus Christi Convention and Visitors Bureau. Some of the most visited attractions are located on North Beach, where the Texas State Aquarium and the  Museum on the Bay are located.

USS Lexington was also part of the set for the 2001 film Pearl Harbor. Corpus Christi's museum district is located near USS Lexington. Some attractions located in the museum district are the Museum of Asian Cultures, the Corpus Christi Museum of Science and History, the South Texas Institute for the Arts, and the Harbor Playhouse Theatre, one of the oldest continually operating community theatres in Texas. Heritage Park is also in the museum district, where a number of older restored houses can be found. The downtown area, of which the museum district is a part, is home to skyscrapers such as One Shoreline Plaza, company offices, various shops, a popular center of marinas, and Mirador de la Flor. Downtown also is home of the Texas Surf Museum, which explores the history of surfing and focuses on surf culture along Texas'  coast, as well as K Space Contemporary, a nonprofit art organization promoting and presenting local, regional, and national contemporary art.

The Corpus Christi Botanical Gardens and Nature Center, also located in the city, hosts gardening programs from time to time. On Oso Bay near the Pharaoh Valley subdivision, the Hans and Pat Suter Wildlife Refuge is known for seabird-watching. The nearby Pharaohs golf course also serves as a haven for coastal and migratory birds.

Directly east of Corpus Christi are Padre Island and Mustang Island, home to various municipal, state, and national parks, most notably the Padre Island National Seashore. The city is also near King Ranch, one of the world's largest ranches, upon which the movie Giant was based.

Sports

Corpus Christi has professional sports to offer residents and visitors.  The city is home to the Corpus Christi IceRays of the North American Hockey League and the Corpus Christi Hooks are the AA minor-league baseball club for the Houston Astros, which play in the Texas League. The largest venue in Corpus Christi is the 18,000-capacity American football venue named Buccaneer Stadium.

Year-round NCAA Division I collegiate athletics may be found at Texas A&M-Corpus Christi as the Islanders compete in 14 men's and women's sports as a member of the Southland Conference.

Sailing races are held weekly off downtown's T-heads every Wednesday, where spectators watch vessels competing at sunset.  Additionally, Corpus Christi is also home to the Corpus Christi Rugby Football Club, which is a member of the Texas Rugby Union, an affiliate of the Western Rugby Union and of the United States Rugby Football Union.

In 2017, the United Soccer League expanded to Corpus Christi, forming Corpus Christi FC.  Corpus Christi FC plays in the Mid-South Division of the USL League Two.

Parks and recreation
The city's location beside Corpus Christi Bay, the Gulf of Mexico, and Laguna Madre provides opportunities for water sports and nature tourism.  Waterfowl hunting is available in the region for duck, geese, coot, and teal. White-winged dove and mourning dove are also hunted on private leases. The brushland inland from Corpus Christi is also ideal for hunting feral hogs and white-tailed deer.

Fishing
Fishing is a popular recreational activity in Corpus Christi, including fishing from various piers around Corpus Christi Bay, wade fishing in Oso Bay, and fishing from the Gulf of Mexico at Packery Channel or at Bob Hall Pier.

Wind sports
The city has one of the highest average wind speeds of coastal cities in North America. This, combined with the Bay Front area located along Ocean Drive, makes the city an important destination for wind sports such as kite boarding, wind surfing, kite flying, and sailing. In 1990, Corpus Christi hosted the Windsurfing World Championships. In 2018, Corpus Christi hosted the 2018 Youth Sailing World Championships.

Skating
The Corpus Christi Skate Park opened on February 17, 2007. It is located in Cole Park on the shoreline of the Corpus Christi Bay near downtown. The  concrete park includes a skating bowl and a street course with stairs, railings, and flat surfaces.

Birdwatching

Being a coastal city, Corpus Christi is a good spot for seabird watching. Popular spots include Blucher Park in downtown, the Hans and Pat Suter Wildlife Refuge along Oso Bay, Hazel Bazemore County Park along the Nueces River in Calallen, and the South Texas Botanic Garden and Nature Center along the Oso Creek.

Government

Municipal government
In 1852, the City of Corpus Christi was incorporated. Texas' 31st Legislature chartered the city as a political and corporate municipal entity in 1909. By ordinance, the city possesses power to "fix, alter and extend its boundaries."

Corpus Christi is under a council-manager municipal government. The elected city council is the primary authority in municipal matters such as enacting local legislation, determining policies, and appointing the city manager. Together, the city council and city manager execute laws and administer the municipal government. Organized by governmental sectors of city council, city management, city secretary, and several city departments, Corpus Christi is seated in Nueces County. The city council currently consists of these elected members:
 Mayor Paulette Guajardo
 Michael Hunter,  At-Large
 John Martinez,  At-Large
 Mike Pusley, At-Large
 Billy A. Lerma, District 1
 Ben Molina, District 2
 Roland Barrera, District 3
 Greg Smith, District 4
 Gil Hernandez, District 5

Peter Zanoni, former deputy city manager of San Antonio, was appointed city manager in May 2019. Upon appointment, Zanoni created two new positions in his leadership team and appointed Michael Rodriguez as his Chief of Staff and Constance Sanchez as Chief Financial Officer. The city manager works alongside Assistant City Manager Steven Viera. The city's intergovernmental relations director is Tammy Embrey. Rebecca L. Huerta serves as the city secretary.

Former City Manager Margie C. Rose was appointed in 2016 and served as the first African-American city manager in Corpus Christi. Rose resigned in 2018. Selman served as interim city manager in 2018 following Rose's resignation and until the appointment of Zanoni.

The Corpus Christi City Charter was adopted by public referendum in 1987, with amendments to the entire charter conducted January 19, 1991, and April 3, 1993. Further revisions to the charter were conducted on November 2, 2004, November 7, 2006, and November 8, 2016. The charter consists of 10 articles and 41 sections regarding stipulations of home rule government, city council and city manager procedures, administration, planning, boards and commissions, etc. The Code of Ordinances of Corpus Christi was codified through Ordinance No. 028493, and adopted Feb. 23, 2010.

From 2012 to 2016, Nelda Martinez was mayor of Corpus Christi, the first Hispanic woman to the hold the office.

On January 19, 2017, Corpus Christi Mayor Dan McQueen resigned from office after 37 days, an outgrowth of a comment by McQueen claiming that the city council members were only high school graduates and he was an engineer.  He does not have an engineering degree and some college graduates are on the city council.

State and federal representation
The Texas 13th Court of Appeals is located in the Nueces County Courthouse in Corpus Christi.

The Texas Department of Criminal Justice operates the Corpus Christi Parole Office in Corpus Christi.

The United States Postal Service operates the Corpus Christi Post Office, the city's main post office, and several station post offices.

Education

Colleges and universities
Corpus Christi is home to several institutions of higher learning: Texas A&M University-Corpus Christi, Del Mar College, Saint Leo University-Corpus Christi  and numerous vocational schools, including Southern Careers Institute, South Texas Vo-Tech, Career Centers of Texas-Corpus Christi, and Vogue Cosmetology School. The city is also home to Stark College and Seminary (formerly known as the South Texas School of Christian Studies) located on Ward Island alongside Texas A&M-Corpus Christi.

Texas A&M University-Corpus Christi is a component of the Texas A&M University System. It was formerly known as Corpus Christi State University, Texas A&I University at Corpus Christi, and the University of Corpus Christi.

Saint Leo University-Corpus Christi Education Center is located at Corpus Christi's Naval Air Station.

Del Mar College is a local community college designated for the entire Corpus Christi city limits. It began in the 1940s at a location behind Wynn Seale Jr. High School. The main campus began with the administration building, which was constructed after World War II on Del Mar. The college grew to encompass a good portion of a residential addition called Southmoreland built from the Bohemian farmlands in the late 1930s. Del Mar now includes a west campus located in the area of Corpus Christi that once was Cliff Maus Airport. Del Mar College is expanding their footprint with the unveiling of their new Southside Campus near Oso Creek. The new Southern branch campus will serve the recent growing Southside area.

Southern Careers Institute offers career training at two Corpus Christi locations, primarily in the medical, business, and cosmetology fields.

In 2015, WalletHub ranked Corpus Christi near the bottom, 138 out of 150 cities in America, for its low educational level and low-income opportunities. To improve literacy levels in the city, a multiyear effort has been made to promote reading through annual literacy festivals.  Started by First Lady Laura Bush and the Texas Book Festival, a series of book festivals is held each spring.

Schools
Seven school districts provide primary and secondary education for residents of the city limits, within Nueces County:
 Corpus Christi ISD
 Calallen ISD
 Flour Bluff ISD
 London ISD
 Port Aransas ISD
 Tuloso-Midway ISD
 West Oso ISD
The portion of Corpus Christi in Kleberg County is within the Riviera Independent School District. The portion in San Patricio County is in the Ingleside Independent School District.

The Roman Catholic Diocese of Corpus Christi provides the primary and secondary education for Catholic schools. Several Open Enrollment Charter Schools are in Corpus Christi. These public schools are: Accelerated Learning Center, Cesar E Chavez Academy, Corpus Christi College Preparatory HS, Corpus Christi Montessori School, Dr ML Garza-Gonzalez Charter School, GCCLR Institute of Technology, Premier HS of Corpus Christi, Richard Milburn Academy, School of Science and Technology, Seashore Learning Center, and Seashore Middle Academy .

Corpus Christi Independent School District

High Schools
 Mary Carroll High School
 Richard King High School
 Roy Miller High School
 Foy H. Moody High School Health Science Academy
 W. B. Ray High School
 Collegiate High School
 Solomon Coles High School
 Branch Academy for Career and Technical Education
 Veterans Memorial High School
 School of Science and Technology College Prep High School

Middle Schools
 Marvin P. Baker Middle School
 Tom Browne Middle School
 Cullen Place Middle School
 Claude Cunningham Middle School
 Robert Driscoll Middle School
 Elliott Grant Middle School
 Carl O. Hamlin Middle School
 R. Haas Middle School
 Harold Kaffie Middle School
 Martin Middle School
 South Park Middle School
 Wynn Seale Academy of Fine Arts Magnet Middle School

Elementary Schools 
 Allen Elementary School
 Barnes Elementary School
 Berlanga Elementary School
 Calk Elementary School
 Club Estates Elementary School
 Crockett Elementary School
 Dawson Elementary School
 Early Childhood Development Center
 Evans Elementary School
 Fannin Elementary School
 Galvan Elementary School
 Garcia Elementary School
 Gibson Elementary School
 Hicks Elementary School
 Houston Elementary School
 Jones Elementary School
 Kolda Elementary School
 Kostoryz Elementary School
 Los Encinos SES Elementary School
 Meadowbrook Elementary School
 Menger Elementary School
 Metropolitan Elementary School of Design
 Mireles Elementary School
 Montclair Elementary School
 Moore Elementary School
 Oak Park Elementary School
 Sanders Elementary School
 Schanen Estates Elementary School
 Shaw Elementary School
 Smith Elementary School
 Travis Elementary School
 Webb Elementary School
 Wilson Elementary School
 Windsor Park Elementary School
 Woodlawn Elementary School
 Yeager Elementary School
 Zavala Elementary School

Alternative
 Student Learning and Guidance Center
 Mary Grett School

Flour Bluff Independent School District

 Flour Bluff High School grades 9–12
 Flour Bluff Jr. High School grades 7–8
 Flour Bluff Intermediate School grades 5–6
 Flour Bluff Elementary School grades 3–4
 Flour Bluff Primary School grades 1–2
 Early Childhood Center prekindergarten and kindergarten
 Head Start ages 1–4

West Oso Independent School District

 West Oso High School grades 9–12
 West Oso Junior High School grades 6–8
 West Oso Elementary grades 2–5
 West Oso John F. Kennedy Elementary prekindergarten to grade 1

Tuloso-Midway Independent School District

 Tuloso-Midway High School
 Tuloso-Midway Middle School
 Tuloso-Midway Intermediate School
 Tuloso-Midway Primary School
 Tuloso-Midway Academic Career Center

Calallen Independent School District

 Calallen High School
  Calallen Middle School
 West Intermediate School grades 4–5
 East Primary School grades pre-K–3
 Wood River Primary School grades pre-K–3

London Independent School District

 London High School
 London Middle School
 London Elementary School

Private/charter/other

 John Paul II High School (8–12)
 Bishop Garrica Middle School (6th-8th grade campus)
 St. James Episcopal (primary, K–8)
 Corpus Christi Montessori School (grades 1–8)
 Incarnate Word Academy (K–12)
 Annapolis Christian Academy (K–12)
 Yorktown Christian Academy (K–12)

Libraries

Libraries in the city include:
 Dr. Clotilde P. Garcia, 5930 Brockhampton
 Ben F. McDonald, 4044 Greenwood
 Janet F. Harte, 2629 Waldron
 La Retama, 805 Comanche
 Owen R.Hopkins, 3202 McKinzie
 Anita & W.T. Neyland, 1230 Carmel Pkwy

TexShare card holders also have limited borrowing privileges at these area libraries:
 Nueces County Public Library in Robstown, Texas
 Mary and Jeff Bell Library at Texas A&M University-Corpus Christi
 Del Mar College Libraries

Infrastructure

Transportation
Corpus Christi is served by Corpus Christi International Airport and Interstate 37. Interstate 69E/U.S. Highway 77 connects the city to Brownsville and Victoria. Texas State Highway 44 is a main thoroughfare that connects Corpus Christi to Laredo and the western part of South Texas by way of Interstate 69W/U.S. Highway 59, Interstate 35, and U.S. Highway 83. The inner-city public transportation is provided by Corpus Christi Regional Transportation Authority with its 28 bus routes. Corpus Christi once had a streetcar system functioning from 1910 to 1931 and a railway station (passenger service ended in 1965).  Despite the convenience of a large harbor, the city does not have a passenger port. 
The city of Corpus Christi has a lower than average percentage of households without a car. In 2015, 8.5% of Corpus Christi households lacked a car, and decreased slightly to 7.9% in 2016. The national average was 8.7% in 2016. Corpus Christi averaged 1.77 cars per household in 2016, compared to a national average of 1.8.

The city is accessed by two major bridges, the Harbor Bridge (US 181) and the John F. Kennedy Memorial Causeway (PR 22). Both bridges are maintained by the Texas Department of Transportation.

Major highways

  Interstate 37
  Interstate 69E; under construction and extension following US 77
  U.S. Highway 77
  U.S. Highway 181
  Texas State Highway 44
  Texas State Highway 286 (Crosstown Expressway)
  Texas State Highway 358 (North Padre Island Drive and South Padre Island Drive)
  Texas State Highway 35
  Texas State Highway 361
  Texas State Highway 357

Water
Drinking water for the city is supplied by three reservoirs, Lake Corpus Christi, the Choke Canyon Reservoir, and Lake Texana. Through an effective regional partnership with the Nueces River Authority and the Port of Corpus Christi Authority, a  pipeline was built which transports water from Lake Texana to the city's O.N. Stevens Water Treatment Plant. It was named the Mary Rhodes Pipeline, after the late mayor. Phase two of the pipeline is underway to draw water from the Colorado River. All reservoirs are outside the city limits, but Lake Corpus Christi and Choke Canyon Reservoir are managed directly by the public utility of the City of Corpus Christi. To support future water needs, plans are being completed to build a desalinization plant.

Notable people

 Kevin Abstract, musician, founding member of Brockhampton
 Amy Acuff, five-time Olympic high jumper
 Mike Adams, MLB pitcher for Philadelphia Phillies
 Devon Allman, musician
 A.A. Allen, Pentecostal evangelist and "faith healer", pastored an Assemblies of God church in Corpus Christi in the late 1940s
 Marshall Applewhite, founder of the Heaven's Gate suicide cult, graduated from Corpus Christi High School
 Barbara Barrie, actress
 Raymond Berry, wide receiver and coach, Pro Football Hall of Famer
 Phil Blackmar, golfer, three-time winner on PGA Tour and single win on Champions Tour
 Justin Brantly, NFL punter
 John A. Brieden, American Legion commander           
 Tammie Brown, drag queen and musician
 Rick Baldwin, NASCAR driver
 Johnny Canales, TV host
 Dabney Coleman, actor
 Roger Creager, country music singer-songwriter
 Henry Cuesta, clarinetist on The Lawrence Welk Show
 Dave Davies, American broadcaster and contributor to NPR's Fresh Air program
 Paula DeAnda, musician
 Tom DeLay, U.S. Congressman and House Majority Leader
 Carlos DeLuna, executed for murder, controversial conviction causing concerns about wrongful executions
 Iann Dior, singer, rapper, and songwriter
 Helen Donath, opera singer
 Ramón H. Dovalina, college administrator and president
 Roberto Elizondo, boxer, two time world title challenger
 Farrah Fawcett, actress and artist
 Blake Farenthold, former U.S. Congressman from Texas 27th District
 Joe Bertram Frantz, historian
 David Freese, MLB player for Pittsburgh Pirates
 Albert Lee Giddens, Texas trial lawyer
 Clint Gresham, Seattle Seahawks long snapper, Super Bowl champion
 Stephanie Griest, author
 Steven A. Hickham Jr., racing driver 
 Jim Heath, musician known as Reverend Horton Heat
 Burt Hooton, baseball pitcher, All-Star and World Series champion
 Todd Ames Hunter, member of Texas House of Representatives, 1989–1997 and since January 2009
 Ernestine Jackson, actress and singer
 Bret Anthony Johnston, author of Corpus Christi: Stories
 Jeremy Jordan, Supergirl (TV series) actor, Joyful Noise (movie actor), Broadway performer
 Jeff Kanipe, author and astronomer
 Larry Kelm, NFL player, an original member of Texas A & M "Wrecking Crew", linebacker for Los Angeles Rams and San Francisco 49ers
 Ashley Kidd, world champion wakesurfer
 Brooks Kieschnick, baseball player
 Bobby Labonte, NASCAR Sprint Cup driver and 2000 champion
 Terry Labonte, NASCAR Sprint Cup driver and 1984 and 1996 champion
 Colleen LaRose, indicted in 2010 for trying to recruit Islamic terrorists to wage jihad
 Chris Layton, drummer for Stevie Ray Vaughan and Double Trouble
 Brian Leetch, NHL defenseman, born in Corpus Christi, but grew up in Connecticut
 Danny Lohner, musician
 Eva Longoria, actress (Desperate Housewives)
 Allen Ludden, TV game show host
 Terrence McNally, playwright
 Irlene Mandrell, musician, actress, model, sister of Barbara and Louise Mandrell
 Louise Mandrell, singer and entertainer, sister of Barbara and Irlene Mandrell
 Victoria Moroles, actress
 Mitch Morris, actor
 Roger Narvaez, Mixed Martial Artist
 Larry Norman, musician and songwriter
 Todd Oldham, fashion designer
 Revilo P. Oliver, 20th-century Fascist scholar, professor, a founder of John Birch Society
 Solomon P. Ortiz, U.S. Congressman, represented Corpus Christi for 28 years
 Jessie Pavelka, actor and model
 Jennifer Peña, Latin Pop and Tejano singer and actress
 Cliff Pennington, MLB player for the Los Angeles Angels
 Paul Peress, drummer, composer, producer
 Lou Diamond Phillips, actor
 Billy Powell, keyboardist
 Selena Quintanilla-Pérez, Mexican/American Tejano singer, Queen of Tejano music, with Selena Y Los Dinos
 A.B. Quintanilla, singer, songwriter with Kumbia All Starz, Selena's older brother
 Suzette Quintanilla, drummer for Selena y Los Dinos, Selena's older sister
Dody Roach, professional poker player, two-time World Series of Poker bracelet winner
 Johnny Roland, NFL player and coach
 Lester Roloff, radio evangelist
 Leslie Sanchez, political pundit
 Pepe Serna, actor
 Sid Sheinberg, ex-president of Universal Studios, helped make Jaws
 Bart Shirley, MLB player for Los Angeles Dodgers and New York Mets
 Ormond R. Simpson, Lieutenant general in the Marine Corps
 Robert Simpson, meteorologist and hurricane specialist
 Lori Singer, actress
 Marc Singer, actor
 Justin Storms, artist, musician
 Martha Tilton, singer and actress
 Raul Torres, state representative from Nueces County
 Carlos Truan, politician
 e.E. Charlton-Trujillo, author, filmmaker and youth literacy activist
 George Conrad Westervelt, naval officer and engineer; co-founder of the Boeing Company
 Don Williams, country and western singer
 Rob Zastryzny, Pitcher for the Chicago Cubs

Sister cities
Corpus Christi keeps a thriving and active relationship with these sister cities:

  Agen, Lot-et-Garonne, France
  Keelung, Taiwan
  Yokosuka, Kanagawa, Japan
  Veracruz, Veracruz, Mexico

In popular culture
 A season 4 episode of the Discovery Channel series A Haunting, called Stalked by Evil, takes place in Corpus Christi in 2005.

Movies

See also

 Corpus Christi Museum of Science and History
 List of mayors of Corpus Christi, Texas
 Mirador de la Flor
 Nueces Hotel
 Old Bayview Cemetery
 Oso Creek (Texas)
 Parkdale Plaza
 Port of Corpus Christi
 South Texas Botanical Gardens & Nature Center
 Texas State Aquarium

References

Notes

Further reading
 Lessoff, Alan. Where Texas Meets the Sea: Corpus Christi and Its History (University of Texas Press, 2015) 360 pp.
Givens, Murphy. Corpus Christi: A History

External links

 City of Corpus Christi
 Corpus Christi Public Library Digital Archive, features local history photographs and materials

 
1839 establishments in North America
World War II Heritage Cities
Cities in Aransas County, Texas
Cities in Kleberg County, Texas
Cities in Nueces County, Texas
Cities in San Patricio County, Texas
Cities in Texas
Cities in the Corpus Christi metropolitan area
County seats in Texas
Hurricane Ike
Nueces River
Populated coastal places in Texas
Populated places established in 1845
Port cities and towns in Texas